Kent Crusaders may refer to:
Kent Crusaders (basketball), an English basketball team
Kent Crusaders (rugby), an American rugby union team
Seattle Totems an American junior hockey team, formerly known as Kent Crusaders
Sittingbourne Crusaders, an English speedway team formerly known as the Kent Crusaders